Schoharie County Courthouse Complex is a historic courthouse and county clerk's building located at Schoharie in Schoharie County, New York. The courthouse building was built in 1870 and is a two-story structure above a raised basement structure built of cut limestone block laid random ashlar.  It features a shallow hipped roof surmounted by an ornate pyramidal cupola and corner turrets of pressed metal.  The county clerk's building is a two-story, hip-roofed, rectangular stone building built of random ashlar limestone in 1914.

It was listed on the National Register of Historic Places in 1995.

Gallery

References

Courthouses on the National Register of Historic Places in New York (state)
County courthouses in New York (state)
Italianate architecture in New York (state)
Buildings and structures in Schoharie County, New York
National Register of Historic Places in Schoharie County, New York